Meyrick Wayne Pringle (born 22 June 1966) is a former South African cricketer who played in four Tests and seventeen One Day Internationals (ODIs) from 1992 to 1995.

Career
Pringle attended and played for Kingswood College at school level. After matriculating in 1984 Pringle started playing provincial cricket for a number of teams, including Orange Free State (1985–1986), Sussex (1987–1998), Eastern Province (1988–1989), Western Province (1990–1998) and Eastern Province again (1998–2002).

Pringle made his ODI debut for South Africa against Australia at the 1992 Cricket World Cup, and at the same tournament had the best bowling performance of his career, taking four wickets for eleven runs against the West indies, a performance which earned him the man of the match award.

He made his Test debut later that same year on South Africa's tour to the West Indies, the first Test played by South Africa since the lifting of sporting sanctions after the end of Apartheid. Pringle took 2/105 in that match. In the following series against India at home, Pringle was injured during the second Test match in Johannesburg. On the second day of the match, Pringle was batting when Indian fast bowler Javagal Srinath bowled him a bouncer which struck him on the eye. Pringle fell to the ground and was forced to retire hurt, being carried off the field on a stretcher. He would not play again until 1995, when he played his final Test match against England.

Pringle announced his retirement from international cricket in 1996 having played four Tests and 17 ODIs for South Africa.

Coaching
After his retirement Pringle coached and assisted in Holland and Namibia before being appointed coaching director at the Jaipur Cricket Academy.  There he coached some local talent including Ankit Lamba, Manoj Datic who became a blogger at a gambling tips blog later, Aniket Choudhary, and Abhijeet Tomar, a couple of his trainees represented the state as well as played IPL. He was appointed as Rajasthan's bowling coach on 5 December 2011 then came on board on a full-time basis for 2012/2013 Pringle is currently consulting at all levels of cricket around the world in all formats of the game. Meyrick is also a Freelancing TV broadcaster (Commentator) (Studio Guest)

Pringle Foundation
In 2009 Pringle started the Pringle Sports & Education Foundation with his cousin Grant Pringle. The foundation is aimed at establishing a system that ensures underprivileged children receive education and sports training. The foundation is also involved in coaching clinics, club and school development and is also looking at working on international scholarship exchanges between various countries such as India.

Commentating

In 2013 South African Sport TV Broadcaster SuperSport (South African broadcaster) launched an IsiXhosa language Channel option for Xhosa viewers in South Africa. Pringle, who is fluent in Xhosa, was asked to join the isiXhosa commentating team. With the start of the Champions Trophy cricket tournament which took place in June 2013, the new language channel did phenomenally well and since to date Pringle has become a controversial figure being the first white male South African to commentate in a South African native language. There has been a tremendous incline of viewers in the channel option and even the viewers have been amazed with the outcome of Pringle's commentating. Pringle's new apparent nickname in the studios is White Sangoma meaning "White Doctor".

References

External links

1966 births
Living people
People from Raymond Mhlaba Local Municipality
South Africa Test cricketers
South Africa One Day International cricketers
South African cricketers
Free State cricketers
Sussex cricketers
Eastern Province cricketers
Western Province cricketers
Marylebone Cricket Club cricketers
Alumni of Kingswood College (South Africa)